Sierra de los Padres is a string of rocky hills and ridges about 14 miles west of Mar del Plata. They are part of the Tandilia's mountain range, actually a series of low, rocky hills extended from the central Buenos Aires Province to Cabo Corrientes, a cape on the shores of Mar del Plata. 
These peaks are barely 270 mt (900 feet) high, surrounded by farms in the lower lands and by an exclusive neighborhood built on their slopes. 
Most local landscapes have panoramic views of surrounding hills.
Recreational activities include trekking, PPC, and a large Golf link. There is an annual trekking and climbing event organized by the "Club Andino Mar del Plata", with more than 300 climbers attending each October.

Along the main access road there is also a Zoo. The neighbourhood has four shopping centers and many facilities for visitors. A large super market and many groceries fill local residents' need of food and beverages.
The winters are a bit colder than in the coastal area and summers are not so mild.
Permanent residents as of 2010 were about 4,300. Most of them are members of the upper and upper-middle class. For the children of the village and nearby residents are one elementary and one middle public schools.
Tap water supplies come from a cooperative, the Cooperativa Sierra de Los Padres.  The area became a special destination for those seeking meditation and relax.

See also

Laguna de los Padres

Notes

External links

 Official Site
 Sierra de los Padres
 Sierra de los Padres tourist info
 Photos of Sierra de los Padres after a snowfall (2015)

Mountain ranges of Argentina
Landforms of Buenos Aires Province
Tourist attractions in Mar del Plata